World (often stylized in all-caps as WORLD) is a biweekly Christian news magazine, published in the United States by God's World Publications, a non-profit 501(c)(3) organization based in Asheville, North Carolina. Worlds declared perspective is one of Christian evangelical Protestantism.

Each issue features both U.S. and international news, cultural analysis, editorials and commentary, as well as book, music and movie reviews. Worlds end-of-the-year issue covers stories from the previous year, obituaries, and statistics.

History
Launched by Joel Belz in 1986 as a replacement for The Presbyterian Journal, a publication issued over the previous 44 years that had been founded specifically "to challenge the assumptions and activities of the liberals and to return the Southern Presbyterian denomination to its biblical moorings", World was intended to serve "an educational rather than an ecclesiastical task—a vision focused on the importance of a biblical worldview for all of life". It started with about 5,000 initial subscribers and only 12,000 after three years. The publishers initially requested donations in every issue to stay afloat.

In 2005, Nick Eicher replaced Joel Belz as CEO. He was succeeded in 2008 by Kevin Martin. In 2012, World began referring to itself as World News Group, which includes its print, digital, and broadcast properties. In 2014, Nick Eicher became Chief Content Officer, responsible for all editorial content for the organization.

Editorial team

World News Group's editorial staff is led by an editorial council, the current members of which are Paul Butler (Executive Producer of WORLD Radio), Nick Eicher (Chief Content Officer), Tim Lamer (Executive Editor—Commentary); Lynde Langdon (Executive Editor—News), Mickey McLean (Executive Editor, WORLD Digital), and Lynn Vincent (Executive Editor—Features and Executive Editor—WORLD Magazine).

Coverage of evangelical controversies
World has received positive critical commentary from the New York Times regarding its investigative reporting on controversies within the evangelical Christian community, citing editors who no longer work for the publication.

In an August 29, 2009, cover story, World reported on the C Street Center in Washington, D.C., and the secretive organization behind it, the Fellowship, a.k.a. "The Family". Scott Horton of Harper's Magazine praised the piece, saying the magazine's "attitude is critical and exacting. The piece looks like serious journalism, much like the publication's exposé work on Ralph Reed and other scandals in the past."  Rachel Maddow, on her August 17, 2009, show said, "The article exposes The Family's mysterious money trail and describes the C Street scandals using the word 'scandal' and argues that The Family subscribes to a, quote, 'muddy theology' and it harbors, quote, 'a disdain for the established church.'"

The magazine reported that Christian apologist and conservative political commentator Dinesh D'Souza had shared a hotel room with his fiancée prior to filing for divorce from his previous wife. After World broke the story, D'Souza resigned as president of New York's The King's College in response.

In December 2018, Worlds investigative report on Harvest Bible Chapel and its pastor, James MacDonald, led to a shakeup at the suburban Chicago megachurch. The article written by freelance writer Julie Roys included detailed information on financial mismanagement and a culture of deception and intimidation at the church. On February 13, 2019, the elders of the church announced the firing of MacDonald.

World Digital
Worlds digital properties are headed by Executive Editor Mickey McLean. The World website includes daily news stories, including daily news briefs called "The Sift," weekly news roundups and editorial cartoons. World's magazine content is also available through its apps for iOS, Android, and Amazon Kindle devices.

World Radio
On August 6, 2011, World launched a weekly two-hour radio news program called The World and Everything in It. Hosted by then-executive producer Nick Eicher and senior producer Joseph Slife, the program aired weekends on U.S. stations and featured reports, interviews, and analysis from the organization's editorial team. In May 2013, The World and Everything in It became a 30-minute daily podcast. Slife left the program in May 2017 and was replaced as co-host by Mary Reichard.

World Radio produces a weekly interview podcast hosted by Warren Cole Smith called Listening In.

References

External links

News magazines published in the United States
Biweekly magazines published in the United States
Christian magazines
Conservative magazines published in the United States
Magazines established in 1986
Magazines published in North Carolina